Uruguay is the only country in Latin America that has achieved quasi-universal coverage of access to safe drinking water supply and adequate sanitation. Water service quality is considered good, with practically all localities in Uruguay receiving disinfected water on a continuous basis. 70% of wastewater collected by the national utility was treated. Given these achievements, the government's priority is to improve the efficiency of services and to expand access to sewerage, where appropriate, in areas where on-site sanitation is used.

Access 
Water and sanitation coverage in Uruguay (2004)

Source: WHO/UNICEF Joint Monitoring Programme (JMP/2006). Data for water and sanitation based on the WHO World Health Survey (2003).

Water use 
Per capita water production is high at 411 liter/capita/day (90.4 Imperial gallons/c/d, 108.6 US gallons/c/d). Even after taking into account non-revenue water of 54%, at 183 liter/capita/day (40.3 Imperial gallons/c/d, 48.3 US gallons/c/d) it is still higher than in many European countries. However, water use is much lower than in neighboring Argentina, where metering is not widespread, while in Uruguay 96% of water connections were metered in 2004.

History and recent developments 

Like many other developing countries Uruguay sought private sector participation in water supply and sanitation to improve efficiency and service quality. This was done through two concessions for secondary cities in the department of Maldonado, home to many tourist resorts and the town Punta del Este. The first concession was granted in 1993 to Aguas de la Costa, a Uruguayan firm which later became majority-owned by Aguas de Barcelona, itself a subsidiary of the French firm Suez. The second concession was granted in 2000 to URAGUA, a subsidiary of Aguas de Bilboa of Spain.

To complement the policy of private sector participation, the government created in 2002 the utility regulatory agency URSEA covering the power and water sector.

Nevertheless, the private concessions remained contentious. Following a vigorous campaign against them and allegations of overcharging and poor service quality, Parliament passed a constitutional amendment in October 2004 prohibiting any form of private sector participation in the water sector. As a result, the concession of URAGUA was withdrawn in the same year.

In 2005 the government passed law 17.930 with the objective of improving the effective participation of users and civil society in planning, management and control of activities in the sector. For that purpose the law established a water and sanitation directorate (DINASA) in the Ministry of Housing and Environment, as well as a Water and Sanitation Advisory Commission (COASAS).

Meanwhile, the Uruguayan and foreign owners of Aguas de la Costa refused to yield to demands for nationalization. In 2006 the government bought the shares held by Aguas de Barcelona. From then on the enterprise operated as a mixed public-private enterprise with a majority public shareholding. In 2009 the company became 100% owned by the state.

Responsibility for water supply and sanitation 
The state-owned national utility, Administración de las Obras Sanitarias del Estado (OSE) provides water and sewer services to all of Uruguay with the exception of Montevideo, where the municipality provides sewerage and OSE provides water services only. OSE serves 330 localities with 2.8 million inhabitants with water services and 152 localities with 0.5 million inhabitants with sewer services. It had 4,362 employees in 2004.  

To enhance sector performance, new institutions have been recently established, including the Regulatory Entity for Energy and Water (URSEA); the National Directorate of Water and Sanitation (DINASA) in the Ministry of Housing, Land Management and Environment, responsible for creating national sector policies on WSS; and the Advisory Commission on Water and Sanitation (COASAS). 

The government of Uruguay intends to establish a comprehensive legal and regulatory framework for the water supply and sanitation sector through a new law. It also plans to develop a policy on appropriate sanitation standards and to further improve the efficiency of OSE by stimulating internal competition and reducing unaccounted for water. Concerning internal competition, OSE has introduced an internal benchmarking system comparing the utility's performance across 21 cities based on 9 service quality indicators.

Economic efficiency 
Between 1999 and 2005 OSE successfully increased labor productivity from 5.6 employees/1000 connections to 4.5, decreased operating costs from US$0.98/m3 (US$0.75/cu yd) to US$0.71/m3 (US$0.54/cu yd); and increased operating margins from 35% to 42%. However, OSE's performance continues to present areas of inefficiency. Reducing unaccounted for water, which remains around 54%, will continue to require a concerted effort.

Financial aspects

Tariffs and affordability 
Water and sewer tariffs charged by OSE differ depending on the category of users, with lower tariffs for residential users than for other users (commercial, industrial, official and public enterprises). Water and sewer tariffs in Uruguay have increased substantially since 1995. For example, a typical residential water bill (20 m3/month, 700 cu ft/month) for OSE consumers increased from the equivalent of 56 pesos/month (US$9.50) in 1995 to 207 pesos/month (US$18.20) in 2001, a 93% increase in US dollar terms in six years. Tariffs were further increased so that a typical residential bill reached 431 pesos/month in 2003. But due to the massive devaluation of 2001 the US dollar equivalent of the monthly bill decreased to US$15/month. In 2007 a monthly residential water bill was estimated to be at least 568 pesos, equivalent to more than US$22/month. 

Given that the average monthly income of a household in the two lowest-income quintiles (a lower-middle income family) was about the equivalent of US$190 in 2003, water and sewer tariffs accounted for almost 8% of their income, an extraordinarily high percentage, which has probably further increased since then. Despite their very high levels, these tariffs are not subject to much public protest or complaints.

Investments and financing 
The national water and sewer company Administración de las Obras Sanitarias del Estado (OSE), created in 1952, does not receive direct subsidies from the government. OSE finances its investments from internal revenues and loans. However, OSE's financial health had been in decline during the 1990s and early 2000 due to high levels of operational inefficiency, thereby threatening OSE's ability to carry out future required investments. OSE's operating performance and financial health have since begun improving.

The total expenditure of OSE between 1990 and 2005 was US$797 million, which is on annual average 0.24% of the Uruguayan GDP or US$15.3 per capita. The annual investment was highest at the end of the 1990s, reaching US$30.8 in 1996 and US$31.2 per capita in 1999. Since 2001, it fell back to only US$5.1 per capita in 2003. The average annual investment per capita between 1997 and 2003 was higher than in other Latin American countries like Argentina, Peru, Colombia and Mexico.

External support

World Bank 
OSE Modernization & Systems Rehabilitation Project APL-2

References

External links 
  Organización Mundial de Salud (OMS): Evaluación de los Servicios de Agua Potable y Saneamiento 2000 en las Américas Uruguay
  Site of the national water and sewer utility OSE
  Site of the national multi-sector regulatory agency URSEA

 
Health in Uruguay